This is a list of countries by net oil exports in barrels per day based on The World Factbook and other sources. "Net export" refers to the export minus the import. Note that the net export is approximate, since the import and export data are generally not for same year (though year-to-year changes are generally small). Many countries are missing data for either imports or exports, but this generally indicates that the missing number is small.

See also
 List of countries by oil imports
 List of countries by oil exports

References

Energy-related lists by country
Exports, net
Trade by commodity
List of countries by oil imports
Lists of countries
International trade-related lists